Primal Force was a comic book series published by DC Comics from October 1994 to December 1995 and ran for 15 issues. The series starred the Leymen, a magic-themed superhero team in the DC Universe. The series premiered with Primal Force #0 (October 1994; the "zero" issue number is a result of the Zero Hour: Crisis in Time! crossover event during which the series debuted) and ended with issue #14 (December 1995).

Members
 Doctor Mist – the team leader; a.k.a. Maltis or Nommo
 The Claw II – Young John Chan was the second man to bear the name the Claw.
 The Golem
 Jack O'Lantern III
 Meridian
 The Red Tornado
 The Black Condor II – joined in Primal Force #7
 Will Power – joined in Primal Force #7
 Noir – joined (and died) in Primal Force #12

References

External links
 Fanzing Secret Files: Primal Force

1994 comics debuts
DC Comics superhero teams
DC Comics titles